The 1936 Colorado A&M Aggies football team represented Colorado A&M (now known as Colorado State University) in the Rocky Mountain Conference (RMC) during the 1936 college football season.  In their 26th season under head coach Harry W. Hughes, the Aggies compiled a 4–4–1 record (3–4–1 against RMC opponents), finished seventh in the RMC, and were outscored by a total of 74 to 67.

Schedule

References

Colorado AandM
Colorado State Rams football seasons
Colorado AandM Aggies football